Terre d'Hermès is a fragrance launched by French luxury brand Hermès in March 2006. It was created by Jean-Claude Ellena, who was the exclusive in-house perfumier of Hermès.

Overview 
Jean Claude Ellena, who was formerly the master perfumier for Hermès, claims that his inspiration for Terre d'Hermès was French author Jean Giono, whom, Ellena claims "He is a man who loves the richness of nature".

As a result of this, many of the scents found within the fragrance are vegetal and mineral based, including Cedar, Patchouli and Vetiver. Ellena would also state that he decided not to use any Musk notes within the fragrance, as 
"Musk creates a mask on the skin", stating that his reasoning for not including this mask was to create a fragrance which was unique to each wearer.

Variations 
Originally released as an Eau de Toilette, Terre d'Hermès was reinterpreted as a Pure Parfum which was released in 2009, this was subsequently followed by a Tres Fraiche version 2014. In 2018, a new variation called Eau Intense Vétiver, created by Christine Nagel was released, and was described as being fresher than the original

Scent 
Terre d'Hermès is  a fruity-spicy-woody fragrance, meaning it features fruity top notes, in this case Orange and Grapefruit, its middle or heart notes are of pepper and its woody base notes, include cedar, patchouli and vetiver.

Reviews 
 

Terre d'Hermès garnered generally favorable reviews from critics and the general public alike. The eau de toilette has a rating of 4 out of 5 stars on the fragrance website Basenotes based on an average of over 2000 votes, whilst the pure parfum distillation has a rating of 4.5 stars out of 5 across an average of 316 votes. Luca Turin rated it three out of five stars.

Awards 
Terre d'Hermès won the Men's Fragrance of the Year - Luxe award at the 2007 FiFi Awards, and also won Best Classic (Men's) Fragrance  for  2012 from Basenotes.  Terre d'Hermès won a variety of awards from GQ magazine, including 'Launch of the decade' and the Readers Favourite fragrance in 2009. It was named Best Classic Fragrance from ShortList magazine.

References

External links
 Terre d'Hermès at Basenotes
 Terre d'Hermès at Fragrantica
 Terre d'Hermès at Parfumo

Perfumes
Products introduced in 2006
Perfumes by Jean-Claude Ellena
21st-century perfumes